Hilton Wallace Brown (born 13 December 1946) is a New Zealand swimming coach and former competitive swimmer who won a bronze medal for his country at the 1966 British Empire and Commonwealth Games.

Early life and family
Brown was born in Auckland on 13 December 1946, the son of Patricia and Wallace Brown, and was educated at Avondale College. In 1970, he married Catherine Margison, and the couple went on to have three children.

Swimming

Competitor
At the 1966 British Empire and Commonwealth Games in Kingston, Brown won the bronze medal in the men's 440 yards medley relay, alongside David Gerrard, Tony Graham, and Paddy O'Carroll. He also competed in the men's 110 and 220 yards backstroke at the same meet. He finished fifth in the final of the 220 yards backstroke, while in the 110 yards backstroke he finished fifth in his heat and did not progress to the final.

Coach
Hilton went on to have a successful career as a swimming coach. New Zealand representatives coached by him include Paul Kingsman, Anthony Mosse, and triathlete Rick Wells. Hilton was the New Zealand team swimming coach at the 1990 Commonwealth Games in Auckland, and he was awarded the New Zealand 1990 Commemoration Medal.

See also
 List of Commonwealth Games medallists in swimming (men)

References

1946 births
Living people
Swimmers from Auckland
People educated at Avondale College
Commonwealth Games bronze medallists for New Zealand
New Zealand male backstroke swimmers
Swimmers at the 1966 British Empire and Commonwealth Games
Commonwealth Games medallists in swimming
Medallists at the 1966 British Empire and Commonwealth Games